In algebra, a nested radical is a radical expression (one containing a square root sign, cube root sign, etc.) that contains (nests) another radical expression. Examples include

which arises in discussing the regular pentagon, and more complicated ones such as

Denesting

Some nested radicals can be rewritten in a form that is not nested. For example,

Another simple example,

Rewriting a nested radical in this way is called denesting. This is not always possible, and, even when possible, it is often difficult.

Two nested square roots
In the case of two nested square roots, the following theorem completely solves the problem of denesting.

if and only if  is the square of a rational number .

 and  where  is a rational number.

This result includes denestings of the form

as  may always be written  and at least one of the terms must be positive (because the left-hand side of the equation is positive).

A more general denesting formula could have the form

In the first case, this means that one can take  and  In the second case,  and another coefficient must be zero.

Proof: By squaring, the equation 

is equivalent with 

and, in the case of a minus in the right-hand side, 
,
(square roots are nonnegative by definition of the notation).

This implies that  is not rational (otherwise the right-hand side of the equation would be rational; but the left-hand side is irrational). As  and  must be rational, the square of  must be rational.

for some rational number 

It follows by Vieta's formulas that  and  must be roots of the quadratic equation

its  (≠0, otherwise  would be the square of ), hence  and  must be
 and 

For explicitly choosing the various signs, one must consider only positive real square roots, and thus assuming . The equation  shows that . Thus, if the nested radical is real, and if denesting is possible, then . Then, the solution writes

Some identities of Ramanujan 

Srinivasa Ramanujan demonstrated a number of curious identities involving nested radicals.  Among them are the following:

and

Landau's algorithm 

In 1989 Susan Landau introduced the first algorithm for deciding which nested radicals can be denested.  Earlier algorithms worked in some cases but not others. Landau's algorithm involves complex roots of unity and runs in exponential time with respect to the depth of the nested radical.

In trigonometry

In trigonometry, the sines and cosines of many angles can be expressed in terms of nested radicals. For example,

 

and

 

In the solution of the cubic equation

Nested radicals appear in the algebraic solution of the cubic equation. Any cubic equation can be written in simplified form without a quadratic term, as

whose general solution for one of the roots is

In the case in which the cubic has only one real root, the real root is given by this expression with the radicands of the cube roots being real and with the cube roots being the real cube roots. In the case of three real roots, the square root expression is an imaginary number; here any real root is expressed by defining the first cube root to be any specific complex cube root of the complex radicand, and by defining the second cube root to be the complex conjugate of the first one. The nested radicals in this solution cannot in general be simplified unless the cubic equation has at least one rational solution. Indeed, if the cubic has three irrational but real solutions, we have the casus irreducibilis, in which all three real solutions are written in terms of cube roots of complex numbers. On the other hand, consider the equation

which has the rational solutions 1, 2, and −3. The general solution formula given above gives the solutions

For any given choice of cube root and its conjugate, this contains nested radicals involving complex numbers, yet it is reducible (even though not obviously so) to one of the solutions 1, 2, or –3.

Infinitely nested radicals

Square roots 

Under certain conditions infinitely nested square roots such as

represent rational numbers. This rational number can be found by realizing that x also appears under the radical sign, which gives the equation

If we solve this equation, we find that x = 2 (the second solution x = −1 doesn't apply, under the convention that the positive square root is meant). This approach can also be used to show that generally, if n > 0, then

and is the positive root of the equation x2 − x − n = 0. For n = 1, this root is the golden ratio φ, approximately equal to 1.618. The same procedure also works to obtain, if n > 1,

which is the positive root of the equation x2 + x − n = 0.

Nested square roots of 2 
The nested square roots of 2 are a special case of the wide class of infinitely nested radicals. There are many known results that bind them to sines and cosines. For example, it has been shown that nested square roots of 2 as

 

 

This result allows to deduce for any  the value of the following infinitely nested radicals consisting of k nested roots as

 

If , then

 

Let us consider the term  defined above. Then

 

where .

Ramanujan's infinite radicals

Ramanujan posed the following problem to the Journal of Indian Mathematical Society:

 

This can be solved by noting a more general formulation:

 

Setting this to F(x) and squaring both sides gives us

 

which can be simplified to

 

It can then be shown that, assuming  is analytic,

 

So, setting a = 0, n = 1, and x = 2, we have

 
Ramanujan stated the following infinite radical denesting in his lost notebook:

The repeating pattern of the signs is

Viète's expression for 

Cube roots 

In certain cases, infinitely nested cube roots such as

can represent rational numbers as well.  Again, by realizing that the whole expression appears inside itself, we are left with the equation

If we solve this equation, we find that x = 2. More generally, we find that

is the positive real root of the equation x3 − x − n = 0 for all n > 0. For n = 1, this root is the plastic number ρ, approximately equal to 1.3247.

The same procedure also works to get

as the real root of the equation x3 + x − n = 0 for all n > 1.

Herschfeld's convergence theorem
An infinitely nested radical  (where all  are nonnegative) converges if and only if there is some   such that  for all , or in other words

Proof of "if" 
We observe that 
.
Moreover, the sequence  is monotonically increasing. Therefore it converges, by the monotone convergence theorem.

Proof of "only if" 
If the sequence  converges, then it is bounded.

However, hence  is also bounded.

See also
Exponentiation
Sum of radicals

References

Further reading 
 

 Decreasing the Nesting Depth of Expressions Involving Square Roots
 Simplifying Square Roots of Square Roots
 
 

Algebra